Rachycentron is the only known member genus of the family Rachycentridae. The genus contains a single living species, the cobia (Rachycentron canadum), and the Late Miocene fossil species Rachycentron stremphaencus from Maryland.

References

Fish genera
Fish genera with one living species
Carangiformes